The Unitarian Universalist Church is a historic church at 20 Forest Street in Stamford, Connecticut.  It is a modestly-sized Gothic Revival structure, built out of fieldstone, brick, and granite, in 1870 to a design by Stamford architect Gage Inslee.  While most of its exterior windows are stenciled in imitation of stained glass, it has two genuine stained glass windows in the choir loft that are between 400 and 700 years old, and were brought over parishioner Thomas Crane.  The church rectory, built 1880, is a handsome Victorian Gothic structure with early elements of Queen Anne styling.

The church complex was listed on the National Register of Historic Places in 1987.

See also
National Register of Historic Places listings in Stamford, Connecticut

References

External links
 Unitarian Universalist Congregation in Stamford - official site

Churches on the National Register of Historic Places in Connecticut
Gothic Revival church buildings in Connecticut
Churches completed in 1870
Churches in Stamford, Connecticut
Unitarian Universalist churches in Connecticut
National Register of Historic Places in Fairfield County, Connecticut
1870 establishments in Connecticut